Diplotaxis varia is a species of flowering plants of the family Brassicaceae. The species is endemic to Cape Verde. It is listed as an endangered plant by the IUCN.

Distribution and ecology
Diplotaxis varia is restricted to the islands of Santiago and Brava, where it occurs between 150 and 920 metres elevation.

References

varia
Endemic flora of Cape Verde
Flora of Brava, Cape Verde
Flora of Santiago, Cape Verde